Clifton is an unincorporated community in Mason County, West Virginia, United States. Clifton had a post office, which closed on May 24, 1997.

The community was named for the cliffs near the original town site.

References

Unincorporated communities in Mason County, West Virginia
Unincorporated communities in West Virginia
West Virginia populated places on the Ohio River